Sailauf is a municipality in the Aschaffenburg district in the Regierungsbezirk of Lower Franconia (Unterfranken) in Bavaria, Germany. It has a population of around 3,600.

Geography

Location

The community lies in the area of the Spessart (range) known as Vorspessart near Aschaffenburg. It is located on the Sailaufbach, a tributary of the Laufach.

Subdivisions

Sailauf has two Ortsteile: 
  (population 2013: 788)
 Sailauf (2,861)
In addition the hamlet  is part of Sailauf. Moreover, the municipal territory includes 19 small exclaves to the northeast (see map) surrounded by the Sailaufer Forst.

Neighbouring communities
Sailauf borders on (from the north, clockwise): Blankenbach, Sommerkahl, the unincorporated area , Laufach, Bessenbach and Hösbach.

History
Sailauf is among the Vorspessart's oldest settlements. As early as 1089, the original parish church in the upper Aschaff valley stood here.

In 1189, the lordly estate of  Sigilovf(e), meaning "glistening brook", and out of whose name arose the placename Sailauf, had its first documentary mention. The first known inhabitant of Sailauf is Gerhardus de Sigeloufe, who is mentioned as a witness in court in 1229. The name "de Sigeloufe" means "of Sailauf" and is therefore also the oldest and perhaps first surname in Sailauf. In the 13th century, Sailauf was for a short time ruled by the Counts of Rieneck, who built the castle Landesere on the nearby . In 1265, the Archbishop of Mainz,  built the hunting lodge castrum vivarium, which was later renamed Weyberhof. When the Plague raged in Europe in 1349, the Vorspessart was all but emptied of people. Newcomers later came to Sailauf from the Steigerwald. In 1552, Schloss Weyberhof was destroyed.

In the Thirty Years' War (1618–1648), Sailauf was almost completely destroyed. In 1789, Saint Vitus's Church (Sankt-Vitus-Kirche) was built above Sailauf, believed to be the fourth church built on this spot. In 1803, lordship of Mainz over the Vorspessart came to an end and in 1814, Aschaffenburg and its surrounding area passed to the Kingdom of Bavaria.

In 1972, the outlying community of Eichenberg was merged with Sailauf.

Governance

Community council

The council is made up of 17 council members, counting the mayor.

(as at 6 March 2008)

Mayor
The mayor of Sailauf is Michael Dümig (SPD).

Coat of arms
The community's arms might be described thus: Argent a bend sinister gules surmounted by a wheel spoked of six of the first, in chief dexter a bend sinister wavy azure, in base sinister an oak sprig with a leaf in bend sinister and an acorn in bend vert.

The German blazon specifies a silver wheel (belegt mit einem sechsspeichigen silbernen Rad), although the example shown here has a golden wheel. This wheel – the Wheel of Mainz – and the bend sinister – the slanted stripe, so called because at the top it begins on the sinister (armsbearer's left, viewer's right) side – stand for the community's history, lasting from the 13th century until 1803, as an Electoral Mainz holding; the tinctures gules and argent (red and silver) were Mainz's colours. The blue wavy bend sinister stands for the community's location at the forks of the Sailauf and the Steinbach, two local brooks. The green oak twig with the acorn refers to the Spessart range, which is thickly wooded with oaks, and in which the community lies.

The arms were conferred on 21 March 1969.

Culture and arts
Sailauf features the yearly Sailaufer Knoblauchfest ("Sailauf Garlic Festival") and the Tsukahara-Festival.

Infrastructure

Transport
Sailauf has an interchange to the Bundesautobahn 3.

Education
Among social institutions there are a kindergarten and a primary school. The community is a member of the association of municipal music schools.

Notable people
 Felix Magath, footballer and trainer
 Bernhard Lippert, football trainer
 Theodor Bergmann, entrepreneur and carmaker

References

Further reading
 Rudolf J. Lippert: Sailauf und Eichenberg im Lichte der Überlieferung. self-published, Obertshausen 2003. (German)
 Werner Konrad, Ferdl Kraus, Waldemar Lippert: Sailauf-Eichenberg. In Bildern um die Jahrtausendwende, Geiger-Verlag 2000. (German)
 Sailauf Eichenberg. Bilder aus über 100 Jahren dörflicher Vergangenheit, by Ferdinand Kraus (foreword), Fred Maier (foreword), Karl Strom (foreword), Gerhard Steigerwald (foreword), Maria Reinhardt, Herta Hubertus, Bruno Eisert, Gottfried Baumann, Geiger-Verlag 1996. (German)

External links

Structural data 1998 

Aschaffenburg (district)